Yan Bronislavovich Kaminsky (born July 28, 1971) is a Russian former professional ice hockey player who played in the Soviet Championship League and National Hockey League between 1989 and 1995. He played for Dynamo Moscow, Winnipeg Jets, and New York Islanders. He was inducted into the Russian and Soviet Hockey Hall of Fame in 1993. He currently resides in Kennesaw, Georgia where he serves as Youth Hockey Director for the Atlanta Madhatters hockey team.

Career statistics

Regular season and playoffs

International

External links
 
 Russian and Soviet Hockey Hall of Fame bio

1971 births
Living people
Denver Grizzlies players
Dizel Penza players
Grand Rapids Griffins (IHL) players
HC Dynamo Moscow players
HC Fribourg-Gottéron players
Lukko players
Moncton Hawks players
New York Islanders players
Sportspeople from Penza
Russian ice hockey left wingers
Soviet ice hockey left wingers
Utah Grizzlies (IHL) players
Winnipeg Jets (1979–1996) draft picks
Winnipeg Jets (1979–1996) players